Japanese Psychological Research is a quarterly peer-reviewed academic journal covering psychology. It was established in 1954 and is published by John Wiley & Sons on behalf of the Japanese Psychological Association. The editor-in-chief is Etsuko T. Harada (University of Tsukuba). According to the Journal Citation Reports, the journal has a 2020 impact factor of 1.444, ranking it 99th out of 141 journals in the category "Psychology Multidisciplinary".

References

External links

Psychology journals
Wiley (publisher) academic journals
Publications established in 1954
Quarterly journals
English-language journals
Academic journals associated with learned and professional societies of Japan